Anna of Hungary (born 1226) was a daughter of Béla IV of Hungary and his wife, Maria Laskarina. Anna was a member of the House of Árpád. Anna gained many titles from her marriage to Rostislav Mikhailovich.

Family 
Anna was the third of ten children borne to her parents. She was sister to three saints: Kinga, Margaret and Blessed Jolenta. Other siblings included Stephen V of Hungary and Elizabeth of Hungary, Duchess of Bavaria.

Her paternal grandparents were Andrew II of Hungary and Gertrude of Merania, sister to Agnes of Merania.

Her maternal grandparents were Theodore I Laskaris and Anna Komnena Angelina.

Marriage 
In 1243, Anna married Rostislav Mikhailovich. Rostislav could not strengthen his rule in Halych, so he went to the court of King Béla IV of Hungary, and there he married Anna.  Anna had always been her father's favourite daughter. He allowed her to exercise more and more influence over him. In his last will, Béla entrusted his daughter and his followers to her son-in-law, Ottokar II of Bohemia, because he did not trust his eldest son Stephen.  Michael inherited their father's part of Bosnia. King Béla IV, having made these assignments to his grandsons, decided also to make some further changes in his peripheral territories, and assigned Slavonia, Dalmatia, and Croatia, which until then had all been under his heir, the future Stephen V of Hungary, to a younger son named Béla.

Stephen was infuriated and immediately revolted against his father; during the ensuing war, Anna and her son, Béla of Macsó assisted Béla IV. Anna's father and brother concluded a peace on 5 December 1262, and according to the peace the kingdom was divided, the latter acquiring the territories east of the river Danube as “junior king”. After the peace, Stephen V occupied the possessions which Anna's sons had inherited from their father in the eastern parts of the kingdom (the former royal possessions in Bereg County and the Castle of Füzér). Anna submitted a formal complaint against her brother to Pope Urban IV, but the "junior king" did not hand back their possessions.

Anna went to live at her son-in-law's royal court in Bohemia. Ottokar married Anna's daughter, Kunigunda in 1261 and they became parents to Wenceslaus II of Bohemia.  Anna's husband died in 1262, leaving Anna a widow. It is unknown when Anna died but probably about 1274.

Children 
The couple had the following children:
Duke Béla of Macsó (ca. 1243 – November, 1272)
Duke Michael of Bosnia (before 1245 – 1271)
Unnamed daughter (perhaps Anna) wife firstly of Tsar Michael Asen I of Bulgaria, secondly of Tsar Koloman II of Bulgaria
Kunigunda, Queen Consort of Bohemia (1245 – September 9, 1285), wife firstly of King Ottokar II of Bohemia, and secondly of Zaviš von Falkenstein-Rosenberg
Gryfina, High Duchess consort of Poland, (? – May 26, 1303/1309), wife of Prince Leszek II of Cracow
Margaret, a nun.

Ancestry

References 

1226 births
House of Árpád
Hungarian princesses
Year of death unknown
13th-century Hungarian people
13th-century Hungarian women
Daughters of kings